Farida Zaman (born 1953) is a Bangladeshi artist and illustrator. She is the chairman and professor of the department of Drawing and Painting at the Faculty of Fine Arts, University of Dhaka. In recognition of her contribution in art, the government of Bangladesh awarded her the country's second highest civilian award Ekushey Padak in 2020.

Early life
Zaman was born in 1953 in Chandpur of the then East Bengal (now Bangladesh). She graduated in fine arts from the Bangladesh College of Arts and Crafts (now Faculty of Fine Arts, University of Dhaka) in 1974 and received her post graduation degree in the same subject from the Maharaja Sayajirao University of Baroda in 1978. She obtained her PhD from Visva-Bharati University in 1995.

Solo exhibitions
 College of Art & Crafts, Dhaka, Bangladesh (1979)
 Institute of Fine Arts, University of Dhaka, Bangladesh (1983)
 Divine Art Gallery, Dhaka, Bangladesh (1995)
 Chitrak Art Gallery, Dhaka, Bangladesh (2002)
 My Country-My Love Bengal Gallery of Fine Arts, Dhaka, Bangladesh (2006)
 Rabindranath Thakur Centre, ICCR, Kolkata, India (2010)
 Bound to the Soil, Bengal Gallery of Fine Arts, Dhaka, Bangladesh (2013)
 For the Love of Country, Nalini Kanta Bhattasali Gallery of Bangladesh National Museum (2019)

References 

1953 births
Living people
People from Chandpur District
University of Dhaka Faculty of Fine Arts alumni
Academic staff of the University of Dhaka
Visva-Bharati University alumni
Maharaja Sayajirao University of Baroda alumni
Recipients of the Ekushey Padak
Bangladeshi women artists
Date of birth missing (living people)